The Second Mas Government was the regional government of Catalonia led by President Artur Mas between 2012 and 2016. It was formed in December 2012 following the regional election and ended in January 2016 following the Mas' resignation.

History
It was composed mainly by members of Democratic Convergence of Catalonia, Democratic Union of Catalonia (which left the government on 22 June 2015), and some independents, all integrated inside the alliance Convergence and Union.

Investiture

Executive Council
The Executive Council was structured into 12 conselleries—not including the post of the President—as well as one Vice President office and one Secretary office.

Notes

References
Ministries. Government of Catalonia

2012 establishments in Catalonia
2016 disestablishments in Catalonia
Cabinets established in 2012
Cabinets disestablished in 2016
Cabinets of Catalonia